Sonia Santiago (also: Sonia Santiago-Brückner, born 1 November 1966) is a ballet dancer and ballet teacher.

Sonia Santiago was born in Madrid. She grew up in Germany and began ballet dancing at age five. She danced first with the companies of the Staatstheater Saarbrücken (de) and the Staatsoper Hannover. In 1990, she was engaged at the Stuttgart Ballet, promoted to soloist in 1994 and to first soloist in 1997.

She danced in choreographies by Maurice Béjart, Nacho Duato, William Forsythe, Marcia Haydée, Jiří Kylián, Hans van Manen, Uwe Scholz and Glen Tetley, among others. From 2001, she has worked as a free-lance ballet trainer and dancer, including dance projects with children in schools.

External links 

 Sonia Santiago Stuttgarter Staatsballett 
 Sonia Santiago Produktionszentrum Tanz und Performance 
 Interview mit einer Balletttänzerin / "Man muss die Bühne mit dem rechten Fuß betreten" Badische Zeitung 
 Move it! / Ein Choreographisches Projekt des Stuttgarter Balletts mit Jugendlichen aus Stuttgart und der Region TanzSzene Baden-Württemberg 2011 

Ballerinas
Ballet teachers
1966 births
Living people